Peter Esele was born on July 24, 1972, in Edo State Nigeria. He is a unionist. Esele was the president of the Trade Union Congress (TUC) for two terms from March 2007- June 2013. He also served as president of the Petroleum and Natural Gas Senior Staff Association of Nigeria (PENGASSAN) from April 2006 to 2008. Acting president of Petroleum and Natural Gas Senior Staff Association of Nigeria (PENGASSAN) from Dec 2005  to Apr 2006, as PENGASSAN deputy president from April 2005 to December 2005. 

Esele has served as board member of several Federal Government agencies and parastatals, and was one of the 2016 Edo gubernatorial aspirants on the platform of All Progressives Congress (APC) who jostled to succeed Adams Oshiomhole, the then governor of the state.

Esele had played key roles in the following sectors of government and private business: Member of the Subsidy Re-investment Program Committee (SURE-P), Member of the Constitutional Review Committee, Chairman, Profund Properties Nig. Ltd, Member of the Post Presidential Election Violence Committee, Director at Trustfund Pensions Plc, Member of Nigerian Extractive Industries Transparency Initiative (NEITI), Member of National Stakeholder Working  Group (NSWG) and Board member, Petroleum Product Pricing Regulatory Agency (PPPRA).

Education

Peter Esele attended Salvation Army Primary School, Agadaga Mixed Secondary School, Edokpolor Grammar School and for his Senior Secondary School Certificate in Benin-City at Edo State. Using his technical skills, Esele went on to work for an American Oil Company in Nigeria and rose through the ranks. He later obtained a B.A. Mass Communications from Abia State University, Uturu, Abia State. Peter Esele is an advocate of technical education as this guarantees the sustenance of many without formal education.

A prodigious learner, Esele attended several local and foreign strategic courses and workshops including: Strengthening Trade Unions for the Challenges in the Nigeria Oil and Gas Industry, Abuja, Nigeria; June 2005, Special Programme on the Trade Union Strategic Planning and Leadership at Michael Imoudu National Institute for Labour Studies, Ilorin, Nigeria; June 2005. Trade Union Administration and Leadership Strategy, National Labour College, Silver Spring Maryland, U.S.A.; November - December 2005. Managing Workplace Conflict and Certification in Mediation at Kansas City, Missouri, U.S.A; November–December 2006. United States Visitors Exchange Program by United States of America State Department, U.S.A; August - September 2007. Investment Strategies and Portfolio Management, Wharton Business College, University of Pennsylvania, Philadelphia, U.S.A; October - November 2012. High Potential Leadership Training, Saïd Business School, University of Oxford, UK, May 2013.

Political appointments

Esele was appointed by former president Goodluck Ebele Jonathan as a member of the Subsidy Re-investment Program Committee (SURE-P). He was also on the Constitutional Review Committee inaugurated on November 17, 2011, by President G. E. Jonathan. Esele was a member of the 2011 Post Presidential Election Violence Committee, and a member of Nigeria Extractive Industry Transparency Initiative (NEITI). He was also appointed by President Jonathan to the National Stakeholder Working  Group (NSWG) and as board member of Petroleum Product Pricing Regulatory Agency (PPPRA). Diezani Allison-Madueke, former Minister of Petroleum Resources appointed Peter Esele as a Member Of Special Petroleum Industry Bill (PIB) Task Force to further facilitate the quick passage of the bill. Esele was also a delegate at the 2014 National Conference.

References

Living people
1972 births
Nigerian trade unionists
Edo State politicians
All Progressives Congress politicians